Vyacheslav Gennadievich Butsayev (born June 13, 1970) is a Russian former professional ice hockey player. He was drafted by the Philadelphia Flyers in the sixth round, 109th overall, of the 1990 NHL Entry Draft.  He last played for HC Dmitrov in Russia's Vysshaya Liga. Vyacheslav is the brother of former professional hockey player Yuri Butsayev.

Playing career
Butsayev played in the Soviet Union for several seasons before coming to North America, including three seasons with powerhouse club HC CSKA Moscow. He joined the Flyers for the 1992–93 season, playing in 52 games and scoring 16 points.

Butsayev was a journeyman in the NHL, playing for the Flyers, San Jose Sharks, Mighty Ducks of Anaheim, Florida Panthers, Ottawa Senators, and Tampa Bay Lightning.  He returned to Russia for the 2001–02 season and has played there since.

In his NHL career, Butsayev appeared in 132 games. He scored 17 goals and added 26 assists.

Personal
After retirement as a player, he worked for HC CSKA Moscow - as an assistant coach and (acting) head coach of the first team, and as a junior A (MHL) team's coach - winning Kharlamov Cup in 2011. In 2014, he was appointed as a head coach of the newly created KHL expansion team - Sochi Leopards.

Career statistics

Regular season and playoffs

International

References

External links
 

1970 births
Living people
Baltimore Bandits players
Färjestad BK players
Florida Panthers players
Fort Wayne Komets players
Grand Rapids Griffins (IHL) players
HC CSKA Moscow players
HC Lada Togliatti players
HC MVD players
Hershey Bears players
Ice hockey players at the 1992 Winter Olympics
Kansas City Blades players
Lokomotiv Yaroslavl players
Medalists at the 1992 Winter Olympics
Mighty Ducks of Anaheim players
Olympic gold medalists for the Unified Team
Olympic ice hockey players of the Unified Team
Olympic medalists in ice hockey
Ottawa Senators players
Sportspeople from Tolyatti
Philadelphia Flyers draft picks
Philadelphia Flyers players
Russian expatriates in the United States
Russian ice hockey centres
Russian ice hockey coaches
San Jose Sharks players
Severstal Cherepovets players
Södertälje SK players
Soviet ice hockey centres
Tampa Bay Lightning players